Castlerun Historic District is a national historic district located at Castlerun near Castlewood, Russell County, Virginia, United States. The district encompasses three contributing buildings that served the spiritual, educational, and social needs of this isolated far southwest Virginia community. They are the Castlerun School (c. 1895), the Castle Run Missionary Baptist Church (1924), and a frame privy (1926).  The one-room school and church are frame, weatherboarded, rectangular buildings with a steep gable roofs.  The school closed in 1951.

It was listed on the National Register of Historic Places in 2000.

References

School buildings on the National Register of Historic Places in Virginia
Churches on the National Register of Historic Places in Virginia
Historic districts on the National Register of Historic Places in Virginia
Buildings and structures in Russell County, Virginia
National Register of Historic Places in Russell County, Virginia